Wade Branch is a stream in Clark County in the U.S. state of Missouri. It is a tributary of the Fox River.

Wade Branch has the name of the local Wade family.

See also
List of rivers of Missouri

References

Rivers of Clark County, Missouri
Rivers of Missouri